The Abbot of Kelso (later Commendator of Kelso) was the head of the Tironensian monastic community at Kelso Abbey in the Scottish Borders. The Abbey was originally founded at Selkirk in 1113 by David, Prince of the Cumbrians (r. 1113–1124), and thus the first three Abbots were Abbot of Selkirk. It was moved to Kelso by David (then King of Scots, r. 1124–1153) and John, Bishop of Glasgow in 1127. The abbot was the first in Scotland to be granted the mitre in 1165. In the 16th century the monastery increasingly came under secular control, and finally in 1607 it was granted as a secular lordship (Holydean) to its last commendator, Robert Ker of Cesford, later Earl of Roxburghe. The following is a list of abbots and commendators:

List of abbots of Selkirk
 Radulf, 1113–1116 x 1117
 William, 1118–1119
 Herbert, 1119–1127

List of abbots of Kelso
 Herbert, 1127–1147. The same as the last abbot of Selkirk; became Bishop of Glasgow.
 Ernald, 1147–1160. Became Bishop of St Andrews.
 John, 1160–1180
 Osbert, 1180–1203. Previously Prior of Lesmahagow, a Kelso daughter-house.
 Geoffrey, 1203
 Richard de Cane (Cave ?), 1206–1208
 Henry, 1208–1218
 Richard, 1218–1221
 Herbert Maunsel, 1221–1239
 Hugh, 1236–1248
 Robert de Smalhame, 1248–1258
 Patrick, 1258–1260
 Henry de Lambden, 1260–1275
 J[ ], 1281
 Richard, 1285–1299
 Thomas de Durham, 1299 x 1307. An English royal appointee. Later became Prior of Lesmahagow.
 Waleran, 1307–1311
 William de Alyncrome, 1317–1326
 William de Dalgarnock, 1329–1342
 Roger, 1351–1353
 William, 1353–1354
 William de Bolden, 1367–1372
 Patrick, 1392–1411(?)
 William de Kelso, 1411–1426
 William, 1435–1447
 Richard Robson (Roberts), 1456–1464
 George Bois (Boy), 1460
 William Bonkil (Bonde), 1462
 Alan de Camera (Kuk, Cook), 1464–1466
 Richard Robson, 1466–1468
 Richard Wylie, 1467
 Robert Ker, 1468–1506
 Richard Wylie (again), 1469–1473. Opposed election of Ker, but resigned his rights. Was Prior of Lesmahagow since 1469.
 George, 1476

List of commendators of Kelso
 Andrew Forman, 1511. Also bishop of Moray (1501–1514), Commendator of May (1495–1515 x 1521) and Commendator of Dryburgh (1509–1514 x 1516); previously Commendator of Culross (1492–1493), later became Commendator of Arbroath (1514), Archbishop of St Andrews (1514–1521) and Commendator of Dunfermline (1514–1521).
 Andrew Stewart, 1511–1517. Bishop of Caithness (1501–1516), as Andrew Stewart I.
 Thomas Ker (Car), 1513–1534
 James Stewart, 1534–1557. Bastard son of King James V of Scotland. Also Commendator of Melrose (1535–1557); not to be confused with his brother and namesake, James Stewart, Earl of Moray.
 Louis de Guise, 1558–1559. Also Commendator of Melrose (1558–1559), succeeding James Stewart.
 William Ker I, 1559–1566
 John Maitland of Thirlstane, 1567. Became Prior of Coldingham (1567–1561) in exchange with Francis Stewart I; later reasserted his right to Kelso (1587–1588)
 Francis Stewart (I) the elder, 1567–1592
 Francis Stewart (II) the younger, 1588
 William Ker II, 1588
 Robert Ker of Cesford, 1592

Notes

Bibliography
 Cowan, Ian B. and Easson, David E., Medieval Religious Houses Scotland, Second edition, Longman Group Limited, (London, 1976)  
 Watt, D.E.R. & Shead, N.F. (eds.), The Heads of Religious Houses in Scotland from the 12th to the 16th Centuries, The Scottish Records Society, New Series, Volume 24, (Edinburgh, 2001), pp. 58–62

See also
 Earl of Roxburghe
 Kelso Abbey

People associated with the Scottish Borders
Scottish abbots
Tironensians
Lists of abbots
Kelso, Scottish Borders